Dr. J.C. McClenathan House and Office, also known as the Medical Center Building, is a historic home and doctor's office located at Connellsville, Fayette County, Pennsylvania.  It was  built about 1895, and is a -story building with Richardsonian Romanesque and Queen Anne style design details.  The stone-clad building features a two-story inset porch, a sloped stone parapet, and three-story tower with decorative frieze.

It was added to the National Register of Historic Places in 2002.

References

Houses on the National Register of Historic Places in Pennsylvania
Houses completed in 1895
Queen Anne architecture in Pennsylvania
Romanesque Revival architecture in Pennsylvania
Houses in Fayette County, Pennsylvania
National Register of Historic Places in Fayette County, Pennsylvania
1895 establishments in Pennsylvania